0 is the integer between −1 and +1, and the numerical digit used to represent that number.

0 may also refer to:
 0 (year), a year used in some calendar systems
 Slashed zero, a glyph used to distinguish the numeral 0 from the letter O
 0 or #0, stage name of American musician Sid Wilson, when performing with the band Slipknot
 #0, a Spanish TV channel formerly known as Canal+
 0, the internal code of the New York Subway's 42nd Street Shuttle
 0 (album), a 2014 album by Low Roar
 0, a character from the Kirby video game series.
 0, a character in Star Trek: The Q Continuum
 Zero, a character in Star Trek: Prodigy
 Zero (Hector Zeroni), a character in Holes

See also
/dev/zero a special file in Unix-like operating systems that outputs zero bytes
 Symbols for zero
 O, a letter of the Latin alphabet
 Ø, a letter of several Scandinavian alphabets
 Circle symbol (disambiguation)
 ∅, the empty set
 0#, the zero sharp set
 Φ, the Greek letter phi
 Θ, the Greek letter theta
 ⌀, the diameter symbol
 00 (disambiguation)
 0° (disambiguation)
 Ø (disambiguation)
 Null (disambiguation)
 Zero (disambiguation)
 Year Zero (disambiguation)